This is a list of rivers which are at least partially located in Italy. They are organized according to the body of water they drain into, with the exceptions of Sicily and Sardinia, which are listed separately. At the bottom, all of the rivers are also listed alphabetically.

Italian rivers are generally shorter than those of other European regions because Italy is partly a peninsula along which the Apennine chain rises, dividing the waters into two opposite sides. The longest Italian river is the Po, which flows for  along the Po Valley.

Rivers in Italy total about 1,200, and give rise, compared to other European countries, to a large number of marine mouths. This is due to the relative abundance of rain events in Italy, and to the presence of the Alpine chain rich in snowfields and glaciers in the northern part of the country, in the presence of the Apennines in the center-south and in the coastal extension of Italy.

Characteristics of Italian rivers

 The widest and largest rivers belong to the Alpine region due to the arrangement and elevation of the relief, as well as the depth of the Po Valley.
On the Tyrrhenian side instead, they are on average longer because the Apennine spurs and the sub-Apennine belt are wider.
 The rivers that flow into the Tyrrhenian sea are longer also because for the first stretch, they follow longitudinal valleys (Apennine valleys) and then run transversally with respect to the axis of the chain, in the south-Apennine area.
 Given the location of the springs and the local rainfall regime, the rivers of Italy are divided into:
Alpine rivers, of glacial origin, subject to flooding in spring and summer because when it is hot the glaciers melt. The lakes that frequently occupy the most depressed parts of the Alpine valleys serve to dampen the rush of the rivers and to clarify their murky waters. In fact, given the rapidity of the valleys from which the rivers descend, the speed of their waters is remarkable and their activity of erosion and transport of rocky debris is sensitive. Decanting is precisely the process by which this material is abandoned in the lakes of which these rivers are tributaries.
Apennine rivers, subject to sudden spring and autumn floods due to the rains. The lean period is in summer accentuated in the Northern Apennines, almost absolute in the southern one, except for some waterways (Aterno-Pescara, Sele, Volturno, Liri-Garigliano, to be limited to those that flow directly into the sea, to which are added Velino, Nera, Aniene all in the Tiber basin, etc.) which are fed by large karst springs that spring on the edge of areas characterized by permeable fissured rocks. In fact, there are no snowfields and glaciers on the Apennines (the only glacier, albeit small, is that of the Calderone, on the northern side of Corno Grande, in the Gran Sasso d'Italia massif, in Abruzzo); rainwater does not always collect in river beds made up of impermeable ground, that is, such as to allow a fair average annual flow.
The Sardinian and Sicilian rivers are torrential (full of water in winter and almost dry in summer), with the exception of Tirso, Flumendosa, Coghinas and Simeto.

List of rivers in Italy over

List of Italian rivers above

Draining into the North Sea
Reno di Lei
From the artificial Lago di Lei (the barrage itself is part of Switzerland), the Reno di Lei runs for a few kilometers through northern Italy before entering Switzerland again, and drains via the Reno di Avers and the Hinterrhein into the Rhine.

Draining into the Black Sea 

Drava (a short section in Italy, continues into Austria, Slovenia, Croatia and Hungary)
The Drava drains into the Danube on the Croatia–Serbia border.
Slizza (three-quarters in Italy, a quarter in Austria)
After entering Austria, the Slizza drains via the Gail into the Drava.
Acqua Granda (half in Italy, half in Switzerland)
After entering Switzerland, the Spöl drains into the Inn, which meets the Danube in Germany.

Draining into the Adriatic Sea

For the purposes of this list, the Italian rivers draining into the Adriatic Sea begin at the coastal border between Italy and Slovenia and follow the Adriatic coast of Italy until it reaches Santa Maria di Leuca. Beyond this point, rivers empty into the Ionian Sea rather than the Adriatic. The rivers are ordered according to how far along the coast the river mouth is from the Italian/Slovenian border, the first river having its mouth the closest to the border and the last being closest to Santa Maria di Leuca.

Timavo (Reka)
Isonzo (Soča)
Vipacco (Vipava)
Torre
Natisone
Cormor
Ausa
Tagliamento
Livenza
Piave
Brenta
Bacchiglione
Adige
Tartaro-Canalbianco-Po di Levante
Po
Reno
Senio
Santerno
Sillaro
Idice
Savena
Samoggia
Limentra di Sambuca
Limentra orientale
Lamone
Uniti
Bidente-Ronco
Montone
Acquacheta
Rabbi
Savio
Rubicon
Marecchia
San Marino
Ausa
Marano
Conca
Foglia
Metauro
Candigliano
Biscubio
Burano
Cesano
Misa
Nevola
Musone
Potenza
Chienti
Fiastrone
Fiastra
Tenna
Aso
Tesino
Tronto
Castellano
Salinello
Tordino
Vomano
Fucino
Mavone
Piomba
Saline
Fino
Tavo
Aterno-Pescara
Sagittario
Gizio
Alento
Foro
Moro
Sangro
Trigno
Biferno
Fortore
Carapelle
Calaggio
Carapellotto
Ofanto
Locone
Canale Reale

Tributaries of the Adige

Avisio
Eisack
Braibach
Derjon
Eggentaler Bach
Pfitscher Bach
Pflerscher Bach
Plima
Ridnauner Bach
Rienz
Ahr
Reinbach
Antholzer Bach
Gran Ega
Gsieser Bach
Pragser Bach
Pfunderer Bach
Talfer
Villnößer Bach
Karlinbach
Passer
Rom
Saldurbach
Schnalser Bach
Suldenbach
Falschauer

Tributaries of the Po

The tributaries of the Po are organized into right- and left-hand tributaries. The lists are ordered from the river closest to the source of the Po to the river closest to the mouth of the Po.

Right-hand tributaries
Varaita
Maira
Grana del Monferrato
Rotaldo
Gattola
Stura del Monferrato
Tanaro
Pesio
Ellero
Stura di Demonte
Gesso
Vermenagna
Belbo
Tinella
Borbore
Triversa
Bormida
Bormida di Spigno
Orba
Piota
Gorzente
Lemme
Stura di Ovada
Erro
Stura di Demonte
Versa
Staffora
Scrivia
Borbera
Grue
Brevenna
Curone
Trebbia
Nure
Arda
Taro
Ceno
Stirone
Parma
Baganza
Enza
Crostolo
Secchia
Panaro

Left-hand tributaries
Pellice
Chisone
Germanasca
Chisola
Lemina
Sangone
Dora Riparia
Cenischia
Dora di Bardonecchia
Stura di Lanzo
Ceronda
Malone
Orco
Soana
Dora Baltea
Buthier
Évançon
Lys
Chiusella
Sesia
Sessera
Strona di Postua
Cervo
Strona di Mosso
Ostola
Marchiazza
Rovasenda
Elvo
Agogna
Erbognone
Terdoppio
Ticino
Olona
Lambro
Adda
Brembo
Enna
Parina
Stabina
Seveso (The Seveso enters the Naviglio Martesana canal which enters the Lambro.)
Oglio
 Frigidolfo or Oglio Frigidolfo branch
 Arcanello or Oglio Arcanello branch
 Narcanello or Oglio Narcanello branch
 Valpaghera
 Valgrande
 Ogliolo branch
 Rabbia
 Remulo
 Allione (river)
 Poia (river)
 Re
 Re
 Clegna
 Figna
 Blé
 Palobbia
 Poia (creek)
 Re
 Lanico
 Trobiolo
 Grigna
 Resio
 Davine
 Budrio
 Dezzo
 Gleno
 Re
 Orso
 Supine
Borlezza (The Borlezza enters Lake Iseo which empties into the Oglio.)
Rino di Vigolo (The Rino di Vigolo enters Iseo lake which empties into the Oglio.)
Rino di Predore (The Rino di Predore enters Iseo lake which empties into the Oglio.)
Bagnadore (The Bagnadore enters Iseo lake which empties into the Oglio.)
Calchere (The Calchere enters Iseo lake which empties into the Oglio.)
Cortelo (The Cortelo enters Iseo lake which empties into the Oglio.)
Opelo (The Opelo enters Iseo lake which empties into the Oglio.)
Cherio
Tadone
Malmera
Mella
Chiese
Caffaro (The Caffaro enters Lake Idro which empties into the Chiese.)
Re di Anfo (The Re di Anfo enters Lake Idro which empties into the Chiese.)
Mincio
Sarca (The Sarca enters Lake Garda which empties into the Mincio.)
Versa

Rivers draining into Lake Maggiore

Boesio
Cannobino
Giona
Maggia (entirely in Switzerland)
Melezzo Orientale (partly in Switzerland)
Isorno (partly in Switzerland)
Margorabbia
San Bernardino
Stronetta
Toce
Anza
Bogna
Diveria
Melezzo Occidentale
Ovesca
Strona
Nigoglia
Ticino
Tresa

Rivers draining into Lake Como

Adda
Albano
Breggia
Cosia
Fiumelatte
Liro
Mera
Acquafraggia
Liro
Pioverna

Draining into the Ionian Sea

For the purposes of this list, the Italian rivers draining into the Ionian Sea begin at Santa Maria di Leuca in the east and extend to the Strait of Messina in the west. Sicilian rivers are excluded because they are listed in their own section below. The rivers are ordered according to how far east their mouth is, the first river having the easternmost mouth and the last having the westernmost mouth.

Lato
Bradano
Alvo
Basentello
Bilioso
Gravina
Gravina di Matera
Basento
Cavone
Salandrella
Agri
Sinni
Crati
Busento
Coscile
Garga
Esaro
Mucone
Neto
Vitravo
Esaro
Stilaro
Allaro
Amusa
Gerace
Bonamico
La Verde
Torno
Amendolea
Melito

Draining into the Tyrrhenian Sea

For the purposes of this list, the Italian rivers draining into the Tyrrhenian Sea begin at the Strait of Messina in the south and extend north up to San Pietro Point near Portovenere. Sicilian and Sardinian rivers are excluded from this list because those rivers are in their own sections below. The rivers are ordered according to how far south their mouth is, the first river having the southernmost mouth and the last having the northernmost mouth.

Marro
Savuto
Tusciano
Sele
Calore Lucano
Tanagro
Alento
Volturno
Calore Irpino
Sabato
Tammaro
Ufita
Isclero
Garigliano
Liri
Sacco
Gari
Rapido
Tiber
Marta
Arrone
Fiora
Ombrone
Arno
Bisenzio
Elsa
Era
Pesa
Sieve
Serchio
Magra
Vara

Tributaries of the Tiber

Allia
Aniene
Cremera
Nera
Corno
Sordo
Velino

Salto
Paglia
Chiani
Chiascio
Topino
Clitunno
Ose

Draining into the Ligurian Sea

For the purposes of this list, the Italian rivers draining into the Ligurian Sea begin at San Pietro Point near Portovenere in the east and extend to the border with France near Monaco. Sardinian rivers are excluded from this list because those rivers are in their own section below. The rivers are ordered according to how close their mouth is to San Pietro Point. The river with its mouth closest to this geographic point is listed first and rivers further away from this point are listed in the order in which their mouth empties into the sea as one proceeds along the coast up to the border with France.
Entella
Lavagna
Bisagno
Polcevera
Cerusa
Varatella
Pora
Centa
Arroscia
Giara di Rezzo
Neva
Merula
Steria
San Pietro
Impero
Argentina
Nervia
Barbaira
Roia (Roya)
Bevera (Bévéra)

Rivers of Sicily

Alcantara
Anapo
Belice
Calcinara
Cassibile
Ciane
Crinisus
Dirillo
Gela
Helorus
Imera Settentrionale
Ippari
Irminio
Mazaro
Platani
San Leone
Salso
Simeto
Troina
Dittaino
Gornalunga
Verdura

Rivers of Sardinia

Cixerri
Coghinas
Flumendosa
Flumini Mannu
Temo
Tirso

Alphabetical list

Acquacheta
Acquafraggia
Adda
Adige
Agogna
Agri
Ahr
Albano
Alcantara
Allaro
Allia
Allione
Alvo
Amendolea
Amusa
Anapo
Aniene
Antholzerbach
Anza
Arcanello
Arda
Argentina
Arno
Arrone
Arroscia
Aso
Aterno-Pescara
Ausa, in the Province of Udine
Ausa, in San Marino and the Province of Rimini
Avisio
Bacchiglione
Bagnadore
Basentello
Basento
Barbaira
Belbo
Belice
Bevera (Bévéra)
Bidente-Ronco
Biferno
Bilioso
Bisagno
Biscubio
Blé
Boesio
Bogna
Bonamico
Borbera
Borlezza
Bormida
Bormida di Spigno
Bradano
Braibach
Breggia
Brembo
Brenta
Budrio
Burano
Busento
Buthier
Caffaro
Calaggio
Calchere
Calcinara
Calore Irpino
Calore Lucano
Canale Reale
Candigliano
Cannobino
Carapelle
Carapellotto
Cassibile
Castellano
Cavone
Cenischia
Ceno
Centa
Cerami
Cerusa
Cervo
Cesano
Cherio
Chiana
Chiani
Chiascio
Chienti
Chiese
Chisone
Ciane
Cixerri
Clegna
Clitunno
Coghinas
Conca
Cormor
Corno
Cortelo
Cosia
Coscile
Crati
Cremera
Crinisus
Crostolo
Curone
Davine
Derjon
Dezzo
Dirillo
Dittaino
Diveria
Dora Baltea
Dora di Bardonecchia
Dora Riparia
Drava
Eggentaler Bach
Elvo
Enna
Enza
Entella
Erbognone
Erro
Esaro (Cosenza)
Esaro (Crotone)
Fiastra
Fiastrone
Figna
Fiora
Fiume di Girgenti
Fiumelatte
Flumendosa
Foglia
Fortore
Frigidolfo
Fucino
Gorzente
Gran Ega
Garga
Garigliano
Gattola
Gela
Gerace
Giona
Gleno
Grana del Monferrato
Grande River
Gravina
Gravina di Matera
Grigna
Grue
Gsieser Bach
Helorus
Idice
Ippari
Irminio
Isarco (Eisack)
Isonzo (Soča)
Isorno
Karlinbach
Lambro
Lamone
Lanico
Lato
Lavagna
La Verde
Lemme
Limentra di Sambuca
Limentra orientale
Liri
Liro (This Liro enters Lake Como.)
Liro (This Liro enters the Mera.)
Livenza
Locone
Lys
Magra
Maira
Malmera
Malone
Marano
Marecchia
Margorabbia
Marro
Marta
Mazaro
Melezzo Occidentale
Melezzo Orientale
Melito
Mella
Mera
Metauro
Mincio
Misa
Montone
Mucone
Musone
Narcanello
Natisone
Nera
Nervia
Neto
Nevola
Nigoglia
Nure
Ofanto
Oglio
Ogliolo
Olona
Ombrone
Opelo
Orba
Orco
Orso
Ose
Ovesca
Paglia
Palobbia
Panaro
Parina
Parma
Passirio
Pfitscher Bach
Pflerscher Bach
Pfunderer Bach
Piave
Piomba
Piota
Pioverna
Platani
Plima
Po
Poia (creek)
Poia (river)
Polcevera
Pora
Potenza
Pragser Bach
Rabbi
Rabbia
Rapido (Gari)
Ram (Rom)
Re di Anfo
Re, in Gianico
Re, in Niardo
Re, in Sellero
Re di Tredenus, in Capo di Ponte
Reinbach
Remulo
Reno
Reno di Lei
Resio
Ridnauner Bach
Rienza (Rienz)
Rino di Predore
Rino di Vigolo
Roia (Roya)
Rotaldo
Rubicon
Sacco
Salandrella
Saldurbach
Saline
Salinello
Salso
Salto
Samoggia
San Bernardino
Sangro
San Marino
Sant'Anna
Santerno
Sarca
Savena
Savio
Savuto
Scrivia
Secchia
Sele
Senales (Schnalser Bach)
Serchio
Sesia
Seveso
Sillaro
Simeto
Sinni
Slizza
Soana
Sordo
Spöl
Stabina
Staffora
Stilaro
Stirone
Strona
Stronetta
Stura del Monferrato
Stura di Demonte
Stura di Lanzo
Stura di Ovada
Suldenbach
Supine
Tadone
Tagliamento
Talfer
Tammaro
Tanagro
Tanaro
Taro
Tartaro-Canalbianco-Po di Levante
Tenna
Terdoppio
Tesino
Tiber
Ticino
Timavo (Reka)
Tinella
Tirso
Toce
Topino
Tordino
Torno
Torre
Trebbia
Tresa
Trigno
Troina
Tronto

Tusciano
Uniti
Valgrande
Valpaghera
Valsura (Falschauer)
Vara
Varaita
Varatella
Velino
Verdura
Versa (This Versa is a tributary of the Po.)
Versa (This Versa is a tributary of the Tanaro.)
Villnößer Bach
Vipacco
Vitravo
Volturno
Vomano

Notes 

 
Italy
Rivers